The Borkou region is a region of Chad which was created in 2008 from the Borkou department of the former Borkou-Ennedi-Tibesti region. Its capital is Faya-Largeau.

Geography
Borkou is located in the Sahara Desert, and contains parts of the Tibesti Mountains in its north. The highest point in Chad, Emi Koussi, is located in Borkou. The Bodélé Depression lies in the south-central portion of the region. 

The region borders Libya to the north, Ennedi-Ouest Region to the east, Wadi Fira Region, Batha Region, Bahr el Gazel Region and Kanem Region to the south, and Niger and Tibesti Region the west. The region's northern border lies within the Aouzou Strip, historically a point of dispute between Chad and Libya.

Settlements
Faya-Largeau is the regional capital; other major settlements include Gouro, Kirdimi, Koro Toro and Yarda.

Demographics
As per the census of 2009, the population of the region was 97,251, 46.6% female. The average size of household as of 2009 is 6.00: 6.00 in rural households and 5.80 in urban areas. The total number of households was 16,191: 10,584 in rural areas and 5,607 in urban areas. The number of nomads in the region was 8,221, 2.1% of the population. There were 96,459 people residing in private households. There were 47,285 above 18 years of ages: 24,775 male and 22,510 female. The sex ratio was 114.00 females for every hundred males. There were 89,030 sedentary staff, 0.80 of the total population. The Dazaga and Tedaga Toubou are the dominant ethnic group in the region.

Administration
As a part of decentralisation in February 2003, the country is administratively split into regions, departments, municipalities and rural communities. The prefectures which were originally 14 in number were re-designated in 17 regions. The regions are administered by Governors appointed by the President. The Prefects, who originally held the responsibility of the 14 prefects, still retained the titles and were responsible for the administration of smaller departments in each region. The members of local assemblies are elected every six years, while the executive organs are elected every three years. As of 2016, there are totally 23 regions in Chad, which are divided based on population and administrative convenience. The Borkou region is divided into two departments, namely, Borkou (capital Faya-Largeau) and Borkou Yala (capital Kirdimi, also called Kirdi).

References

 
Regions of Chad